John Andrew North (born 19 November 1970) is a former English first-class cricketer.

Life and career
In 1990, North made a single Youth One Day International appearance for England Young Cricketers against Pakistan Young Cricketers. Prior to this, North had made his first-class debut for Sussex against Kent in the 1990 County Championship. He made 22 further first-class appearances for the county, the last of which came against Essex in the 1993 County Championship. An all-rounder, North scored a total of 513 runs in his 23 first-class appearances, which came at an average of 20.52, with a high score of 114. This score, which was his only first-class century, came against Essex in his final first-class match. With the ball, he took 44 wickets at a bowling average of 35.84, with best figures of 4/47.

North made his debut in List A cricket for the county in his debut season, against Middlesex in the Benson & Hedges Cup. Used more frequently as a one-day player, he made 48 further List A appearances for the county, the last of which came against Warwickshire in the 1995 AXA Equity & Law League. In his 49 List A appearances for the county, he scored a total of 440 runs at an average of 12.94, with a high score of 56. This score was his only List A half century and came against Durham in 1992. With the ball, he took 29 wickets at an average of 38.17, with best figures of 3/24.

With the emergence of all-rounder Robin Martin-Jenkins in 1995, North's opportunities at Sussex, which in his latter season with the county had become limited, became more so with Martin-Jenkins' emergence.  He left Sussex at the end of the 1995 season, making subsequent appearances in Second XI cricket for Surrey, Northamptonshire and Nottinghamshire, but was unable to secure contracts with any.

References

External links
John North at ESPNcricinfo
John North at CricketArchive

1970 births
Living people
People from Slindon
English cricketers
Sussex cricketers